The Nokia rinGo (named after "Ring and Go") is an entry-level analogue consumer mobile phone from Nokia, originally released for the analogue NMT-900 network in Finland, Norway, Sweden, Denmark and Netherlands. Two revisions were released afterwards.

History
The first rinGo (code NHX-2N) phone was launched for NMT in November 1995. It had a very simple design and came in either grey or green with a small monochromatic LCD screen. The Nokia rinGo was designed to be easy to use straight out of the box and was cheap to buy, due to special mobile carrier tariffs. An ETACS version of the rinGo with minor design changes was launched in 1997 in the United Kingdom and Austria. It was the UK's first pay as you go Nokia handset through Vodafone's pay as you talk package. It was also sold in Thailand under the name Wave900.

In press releases it was also called a 'concept', a way of easily buying and using a mobile phone without operator registration. Nokia unusually created a unique "rinGo" brand and logo for it.

In September 1997 a new rinGo model (NHX-4N) was introduced for ETACS with a big oval shaped button for accepting and rejecting calls, and was thinner and available in a variety of colours. Later in October 1998 a third (NHX-7) model was released for ETACS in Italy and Spain (the latter via operator Moviline). It featured the "Navi-key" like on the GSM Nokia 3110 and Nokia 5110 and had its top antenna positioned in the middle.

The phones have the capacity to store about 60 contacts. Calculator, Watch and Calendar were pre installed on the handset.

Nokia marketed original rinGo targeting women and children. However it gained a negative reputation and in Sweden earned the nickname "bimbo phone", leading to low sales. Interest and popularity of the rinGo quickly faded and it has been largely forgotten since.

See also
List of Nokia products

References

External links
 Nokia Museum

Ringo